Aragua State is one of the 23 states of Venezuela. It is located in the north-central region of Venezuela. It has plains and jungles and Caribbean beaches. The most popular are Cata and Choroni. It has Venezuela's first national park which is called Henri Pittier. The capital is Maracay, other important cities include Turmero and El Limón.

Etymology
The name of the state comes from an indigenous word of Cumanagoto (Caribbean) origin, which is used to refer to the Chaguaramo, a type of palm from the region [quotation required] However, according to Carlos Blanco Galeno, a chronicler from Turmero, it derives from the Cariban aregua, and this de are ('site') and gua which in turn derives from ogun ('my thing'), so it would mean 'my place, my country'. This same word inspired the name of the Aragua River, an important tributary of Lake Valencia.

History

The land where the city of Maracay is located today was granted to Sebastián Díaz Alfaro in the 16th century. After his death the land passed to his son Mateo. At that time these lands were known as Valle de Tucupío and Tepatopo and were used as cattle grazing lands. Towards Tucupío, Tapatapa, Guey and El Rincón, sugar cane and cocoa were planted.

By the year 1700 about 40 families inhabited the valley, which went to Bishop Diego de Baños y Sotomayor to choose a parish, which was equivalent to giving consistency to the official population center.

On March 5, the city of Maracay was founded, taking its name from the Maracay River. Maracay suffered the vicissitudes of the emancipatory revolution, being of special interest the events of 1812-13 that took place at the La Trinidad hacienda. Later, in 1816 and 1818, there was the assault of La Cabrera and the battle of Maracay where the patriotic troops were defeated. The Federal War also left its mark on the town, seriously affecting the surrounding countryside. In addition, there was a terrible plague epidemic, apparently caused by the decomposition of fermented indigo, which claimed many victims.

The beginnings of Maracay's urban and economic transformation began during the administration of General Juan Vicente Gómez, who resided in the city from the beginning of his government. In 1898, La Victoria was designated as the capital of the state and later, in 1917, it was moved to Maracay, a status it still retains.

Conquest and Spanish Colonial Era
Aragua was part of the Province of Caracas from 1555.

European groups later penetrated the area of Aragua than what is now Carabobo or Miranda. It was in the last decade of the 16th century when the Spanish began to implant encomiendas in the Valleys of Aragua. By 1620 all the lands of Aragua were divided among some 40 encomenderos, who lived primarily in the Valley of Caracas.

Maracay was founded in 1701.

By 1780 La Victoria was a town with about 800 Indians who only spoke Spanish and more than 4 thousand people from other groups, including Spaniards, Creoles, mestizos, blacks and Zambos.

Alexander von Humboldt referred to the fact that the population by 1800 in the area of the valleys of Aragua - which at that time included both sides of Lake Valencia - was mostly composed of brown and creole people, apart from zambos and slaves and that there were still approximately 5000 registered Indians, most of whom were concentrated in Turmero and Guacara. None of them spoke their ancestral languages anymore.

19th century
Aragua was created as a province on February 11, 1848 when it was separated from that of Caracas, with a territory similar to that which today encompasses the current state of Aragua and composed of La Victoria, Turmero, Maracay, Villa de Cura and San Sebastian, having the city of La Victoria as its capital.

In 1864 Aragua became an independent state until 1866, when it merged with Guárico to form the state of Guzmán Blanco. Its capital changed to Villa de Cura in 1881. Finally in 1899 Aragua recovered its status as an autonomous state

20th century
In 1917 its capital was moved from La Victoria to Maracay. The dictator Juan Vicente Gómez stayed most of his time in Maracay and it was there that he died in 1935.

Its definitive limits were established by protocols signed with the bordering states at different times: in 1909 (Miranda), 1917 (Carabobo) and 1933 (Guárico).

In 1989 he elected his first governor under direct universal and secret elections which ended the practice of having a government designated from the central government in Caracas.

Geography

Aragua borders the Caribbean Sea to the north, with its coastline backed by the fast-rising central Cordillera mountain range. Codazzi Peak reaches over 2400 m above sea level. Much of the rest of the state is made up of fertile valleys used for intensive agriculture, apart from in the extreme south where the flats of the central Llanos region begin. On the western border is Lake Valencia.

The main rivers in the state are the Aragua, the Guárico, the El Limón, the Tuy, the Pao and the Turmero. They flow into the Caribbean Sea, Lake Valencia, or feed the vast Orinoco River network. The Camatagua reservoir is one of the main reservoirs supplying Caracas.

Geology

Four natural regions can be distinguished in the entity: the coastal mountain range, the depression of Lake Valencia, the inland mountain range, and the Central Wavy Plains. In the depression of Lake Valencia, recent sedimentary formations predominate, while the mountainous areas present others that are highly affected by metamorphic processes, although in the presence of nuclei with more conserved igneous and sedimentary rocks. In the mountain ranges of the Interior chain, galleys can be observed, as spurs of that mountain range, which smoothen their forms towards the South until they enter the formation of the plains.

Area

The region has an area of 7,014 km², most of which is mountainous, and represents 0.76% of the Venezuelan territory. The maritime coast of the state extends from Turiamo Bay in the west to Puerto Maya in the east, corresponding to the central section of the Coastal Range. The southern zone of the state runs from the southern piedmont lands of the Caribbean mountain range, through the curve of the 100 meter level that separates the Llanos Altos from the Llanos Bajos to the depression of the Unare River and the San Carlos River that separates it from the Llanos Altos Occidentales.

Relief

One of the largest reliefs in the world crosses the state of Aragua, in an east-west direction, two parallel mountain ranges, separated from each other by a central depression, which determines the existence of three well-differentiated physiographic regions, which follow each other from north to south. The northern end is hilly with the central stretch of the Litoral mountain range that culminates with El Cenizo peak at 2,436 meters above sea level and Codazzi peak at 2,426 meters above sea level.

Hydrography

The hydrographic network of the state is part of three major points: the tip of the Caribbean Sea, formed by the rivers; San Miguel, Ocumare, Cata, Gaurapito, Aroa and through the river Tuy, the rivers of its upper basin: the Orinoco river basin, formed by the high point and part of the middle point of the Guárico river and the middle part of the Memo river and finally, the endorheic point of the Valencia lake where the Aragua, Turmero, Maracay, Caño Grande, Tapatapa, Tocorón and Las Minas rivers pour their waters. In the latter, the surface courses have been considerably reduced, as it is no longer possible to use the water from these rivers for human consumption. These rivers have now become the main collectors of wastewater discharges, both for urban industrial and agricultural use.

Climate

Due to its diversity in relief and altitudes that it possesses in all its extension, there are different thermal floors in which the temperature tends to have different climatic characteristics and temperatures that decrease with the increase of the altitude, in the coastal strip dominates a semi-arid and warm climate, as it is evidenced in Turiamo and Puerto Maya, Although orographic rainfall occurs at elevations on the northern flank of the Serranía de Litoral, allowing for cooler and more humid conditions, which make possible the formation of cloud forests in the Henri Pittier National Park, local conditions allow for greater humidity and warmer temperatures in some coastal coves, such as Chuao, Choroní and Ocumare, which are used in traditional cocoa plantations.

At the altitudes of the Coastal Range, an isothermal climate is expressed, reaching in Colonia Tovar, at 1,900 meters above sea level, an average annual temperature of only 15.4 °C and rainfall of 1,000 mm per year. In the depression of Lake Valencia and the valleys of Aragua, warmer conditions are recognized. In Maracay, at 545 meters above sea level, an average annual temperature of 25 °C and annual rainfall of 834 mm are recorded, with a well-defined dry season. In the plain sector, there is a rainy tropical savanna climate, with an average rainfall of 1,100 mm, a rigorous dry season and average annual temperatures of 26 °C.

Soils

The lands of the valleys of Aragua are rich in minerals, as well as fertile; even the mountainous areas are suitable for certain types of crops. There you can find soils with a medium accumulation of organic matter and clay. The banks of the lake show a formation of calcium content due to the presence of fossils. Due to these characteristics, the soil of the state of Aragua is one of the most fertile in the country.

Vegetation
Vegetation ranges from abundant foliage trees, present in the cloud forests of the Henri Pittier National Park, on the Litoral mountain range, to thorny scrub in the coastal area. In the areas of valleys and savannahs, grasses predominate, accompanied by trees such as kapok, cedar and saman.

Politics and government

As a federal state, it is autonomous and equal in political terms to the other members of the Federation, it organizes its administration and public powers through the Constitution of Aragua State, which was adopted in 2002. The same establishes the division of powers into executive and legislative. This Constitution can only be reformed totally or partially by the legislative power of Aragua, and to be approved, they need the absolute majority of the state deputies.

Executive branch
It is composed of the governor of Aragua and a group of state secretaries who are appointed by him. The governor is elected by the people by direct and secret vote for a period of four years and with the possibility of immediate re-election for an equal period, being in charge of the state administration.

Since direct elections for Venezuela state governors in 1989, Aragua has been governed by the Movement for Socialism and PODEMOS (1989 - 2008). The current governor is Daniela González of the PSUV.

Like the other 23 federal entities of Venezuela, the State maintains its own police force, which is supported and complemented by the National Police and the Venezuelan National Guard.

Legislative power
The State Legislature is the responsibility of the Legislative Council of the unicameral Aragua State, elected by the people through direct and secret vote every four years, being able to be reelected for new consecutive periods, under a system of proportional representation of the population of the state and its municipalities, the State has 9 main deputies and their substitutes, of which 8 belong to the opposition and 1 to the officialism according to the elections held in December 2015.
The governor is accountable for his actions to the legislative council and must report to it, which approves the regional budget.

Municipalities and municipal seats 

Aragua comprises eighteen municipalities (municipios):

 Bolívar (San Mateo)
 Camatagua (Camatagua)
 Francisco Linares Alcántara (Santa Rita)
 Girardot (Maracay)
 José Angel Lamas (Santa Cruz)
 José Félix Ribas (La Victoria)
 José Rafael Revenga (El Consejo)
 Libertador (Palo Negro)
 Mario Briceño Iragorry (El Limón)
 Ocumare de la Costa de Oro (Ocumare de la Costa)
 San Casimiro (San Casimiro)
 San Sebastián (San Sebastián)
 Santiago Mariño (Turmero)
 Santos Michelena (Las Tejerías)
 Sucre (Cagua)
 Tovar (Colonia Tovar)
 Urdaneta (Barbacoas)
 Zamora (Villa de Cura)

Demographics 
Aragua State, with 8.28% of the country's total population, is the sixth most populated state in Venezuela. The total population of the state was 2,093,224 inhabitants in 2015.
The population is located on the coast and in the lower valleys. The valleys of Aragua are one of the most populated regions of Venezuela, due to the rapid process of industrialization of the city of Maracay and its important metropolitan area of more than 2.1 million inhabitants, of which a little more than 230,000 inhabitants, are part of its area of influence spread between the states of Carabobo and Guárico.

Race and ethnicity 

According to the 2011 Census, the racial composition of the population was:

The population in the region is very diverse, due to the influence of immigration that existed from the 1950s until the present day. Most of its population is a product of the mixing between Spaniards and local natives or Spaniards and Africans. In the northern part of the state, where the highest population density and the largest urban area in the state are found, the majority of whites are present, especially in the municipalities: Tovar, Mario Briceño Iragorry and Girardot.

The Municipality of Tovar, in the north of the state, is populated almost entirely by white people of German descent, since this was the site of the Tovar Colony, a town founded by Germans who immigrated to Venezuela in the nineteenth century.

Transport
There are a total of 2,170.5 km of trunk, local, branch and sub-runner roads in the state, of which 47.7% are paved, the most important being the regional highway in the center (Trunk 1) that connects it with the states of Carabobo, Miranda and the Capital District; Trunk 2 that crosses the state from north to south and connects it with the state of Guárico, and the local ones 6 and 7 that go to the coast of Aragüa.

Culture

Handicrafts
In the state there are small towns like Colonia Tovar, Magdaleno, La Villa, Tocorón, Palo Negro, among others. Here you can enjoy a rich artisan heritage typical of their beliefs, lifestyle and wealth, but each town in the region is full of artists and cultured people who in their small workshops manage to enrich the streets and homes with their works and their Creole handcrafted candy, also has in the central area with one of the most representative groups of contemporary craftsmen of the urban feeling located in the corridors of the Museum of Anthropology and History of Maracay.

Traditional Events
Velorio de Cruz de Mayo.
La Llora.
Toro de colores
San Juan Bautista.
Los Pastores del Niño Jesús de El Limón and Chuao.
Los Diablos Danzantes de Cuyagua, Cata, Ocumare, Turiamo and Chuao.(In Venezuela there are 11 Brotherhoods of which 5 are from Aragua).
Burras Tradicionales.
Joropo Central.
Parranda Central
Gorilas de San Mateo.
Jokilis y Gorilas de la Colonia Tovar.

Museums
Museo Aeronáutico de Maracay: This museum of military and civil aeronautical technology was created in 1963 in the spaces where the Aragua Air Base and the first Military Aviation School in the country used to operate.

Museum of Anthropology and History of Maracay: The Museum of Anthropology and History contains the archaeological findings of the states of Aragua and Carabobo that were found as of 1889 during the government of General Guzmán Blanco, when the main towns and cities began to be built.
Mario Abreu Museum of Contemporary Art (MACMA): with an important collection of plastic arts from the 20th century.
CADAFE Museum: this museum is located in the parish of Choroní, in the Girardot municipality.
Colonia Tovar History and Craftwork Museum: one of the most important and interesting attractions of Colonia Tovar is its museum. In it, its creator, the city's chronicler, Professor Néstor Rojas, has put a great deal of his life into showing visitors and residents a piece of the history of the Colony.
Museo Nacional de Suelos CENIAP: This museum is located in El Limón de Maracay. It has more than 600 soil micromonolites and 11 macromonolites from 20 states in Venezuela. A micromonolite is a small representation of a soil profile accompanied by information regarding the profile (horizons and characterization) and information regarding the collection site of the samples (climate, landscape, use, etc.).

Theatres
Teatro Ateneo de Maracay: the original name was the "Teatro Circo Maracay" the work was sent to build by General Juan Vicente Gomez to the meridian Epifanio Balza Davila, its architecture is based on the Art Deco style, but due to the bad temper of General Gomez this does not have a particular style.
Maracay Opera House: the work was entrusted to the architect Luis Malaussena, who together with Carlos Raúl Villanueva developed the monumental project full of sobriety within its spectacular nature where horizontal lines predominate while some free spaces compensate for the heaviness of this predominance.

Tourism

The state of Aragua is famous within Venezuela especially for the variety and beauty of its beaches, natural monuments, extensive green areas and for the Colonia Tovar, a territory colonized by the Germans.

Henri Pittier National Park
It is the oldest park in the country, since it is the first national park decreed in Venezuela, originally created in 1937 with the name of Rancho Grande and renamed in 1953 with the name of that Swiss geographer, botanist and ethnologist, who arrived in Venezuela in 1917 and classified more than 30 thousand plants in the country. The park has an irregular and abrupt topography. Its geological constitution is basically of metamorphic igneous rock. Likewise, there are rocky coastal environments. Its altitude ranges from sea level to 2430 m at Cenizo peak. Orchids, ferns and climbing vines abound.

Pico Codazzi Natural Monument
It is one of the highest peaks of the Coastal Range and is characterized by rainforest vegetation on its slopes. It takes its name from the Italian naturalist-cartographer and geographer Agustín Codazzi who arrived in Venezuela in 1827. It was he who promoted the mobilization of German farmers to that area, giving rise to the Colonia Tovar.

Natural heritage
Onoto Hot Springs
Villa de Cura Hot Springs.
Bay of Cata.
Bay of Turiamo
Choroní.
Ocumare.

Ensenada de Café.
Chuao.
Cuyagua.
Ensenada Juan Andrés.
Ensenada Puerto Maya.
Lake of Valencia.
Tasajera Mountains.
Manantial La Peñita and El Banco.
Codazzi Peak.
Aroa.

Built heritage
Sindoni Tower.
Ateneo de Maracay Theatre.
House of Culture of Maracay.
Culture House of La Victoria.
Casona de Santa Rita.
Colonia Tovar.
Institute of Anthropology and History of the State of Aragua
Aeronautical Museum.
Archaeology Museum.
Museum of Fine Arts.
History Museum.
Military History Museum.
Casa del Ingenio San Mateo
Ornithological Museum.
Maracay Opera House.
Zoo of Maracay.
El Limón Tower

Sports 

The Tigres de Aragua, a team of the Venezuelan Professional Baseball League, represents the state and plays in Maracay.
Aragua F.C. Is A Soccer Club In Maracay
  Aragua Fútbol Club
  Toros de Aragua
  Aragua Voleibol Club
  Tigres de Aragua
  Proyecto Alcatraz Rugby Club

Media

Regional Television

TVS 
TeleAragua
TVR
ICT TV
NOVA TV
Aragua TV

Newspapers

The main newspapers are:

El Aragüeño.
El Siglo.
El Periodiquito.
El Clarín de La Victoria.
Ciudad MCY.

Radio

 Aragueña 99.5 FM
 Rutas 90.7 FM

See also 
 States of Venezuela
 Dancing devils of Corpus Christi

References

External links 

 Ciudad Maracay. Information about Maracay and Aragua State
  INE, Population statistics for Aragua

 
States of Venezuela
States and territories established in 1899